Castilleja applegatei is a species of Castilleja known by the common names Applegate's Indian paintbrush and wavyleaf Indian paintbrush.

It is native to the western United States. It is a short perennial with sticky, wavy-edged leaves, which are divided closer to the top of the plant. It bears bright, showy paintbrush-shaped inflorescences of small red to yellowish-red tubular flowers.

Like other species of Indian paintbrush, it is a root parasite, feeding off plants such as sagebrush. Although it can survive without parasitizing other plants, individuals which take a host grow faster and larger.

There are five subspecies. They are variable in appearance but distinguishable from other Castilleja species by the wavy margins and stickiness of the leaves.

References

External links

Calflora Database: Castilleja applegatei'' (Wavy Leaved Paintbrush,  pine Indian paintbrush, wavy leaf paintbrush)
Jepson Manual Treatment of Castilleja applegatei

applegatei
Flora of California
Flora of Idaho
Flora of Nevada
Flora of Oregon
Flora of Utah
Flora of Wyoming
Flora of the Great Basin
Flora of the Cascade Range
Flora of the Sierra Nevada (United States)
Natural history of the California chaparral and woodlands
Natural history of the California Coast Ranges
Natural history of the Peninsular Ranges
Natural history of the San Francisco Bay Area
Natural history of the Santa Monica Mountains
Natural history of the Transverse Ranges
Flora without expected TNC conservation status